Freake is a surname. Notable people with the surname include:

Charles Freake, English architect and builder
Edmund Freke (also spelled Freake or Freak;  1516–1591), English dean and bishop
Frederick Freake (1876–1950), British polo player

See also
Freake baronets
Freake Painter, anonymous 17th-century American artist